Jamie Mackenzie (born February 28, 1989) is a retired Canadian rugby union player who played scrum-half for the Toronto Arrows of Major League Rugby (MLR). 

He was a member of the Canadian squad at the 2011 Rugby World Cup.

Mackenzie is the younger brother of fellow Canadian international player Phil Mackenzie.

References

External links

1989 births
Living people
Canadian rugby union players
Canada international rugby union players
Toronto Arrows players
Sportspeople from Oakville, Ontario
Rugby union scrum-halves
Esher RFC players